The Baiyi Zhuan is a description of the Dai polity of Mong Mao in 1396 written by two envoys, Qian Guxun and Li Sicong, sent by the Ming court in China to resolve conflicts between the Ava Kingdom in Burma and Mong Mao, also known as Luchuan-Pingmian. The description includes the history, geography, political and social organization, customs, music, food, and products of the region (Sun Laichen, 1997).  Ming Shilu describes the work:

References 

 Jiang Yingliang (1980) Baiyi zhuan jiaozhu [Annotated version of the Baiyi zhuan], Kunming: Yunnan Renmin Chubanshe.
 Sun Laichen (1997) Chinese Historical Sources on Burma: A Bibliography of Primary and Secondary Works," The Journal of Burma Studies, Volume 2: Special Issue, 1997, pp. 1-116.
 Wade, Geoff (1996) "The Bai Yi Zhuan: A Chinese Account of Tai Society in the 14th Century," 14th Conference of the International Association of Historians of Asia (IAHA), Chulalongkorn University, Bangkok, Thailand. (Includes translation of (Jiangliang, 1980), a copy can be found at the Thailand Information Center at Chulalongkorn Central Library)

Chinese history texts
14th-century history books
History of Myanmar
Ming dynasty
Tai history